The 1971 Grand National was the 125th renewal of the Grand National horse race that took place at Aintree near Liverpool, England, on 3 April 1971.

Gay Buccaneer was very unlucky having been the clear leader at the Canal turn on the first circuit, only to be interfered with by a loose horse which resulted in him going from first to last, and finishing tenth. Specify was the winner from a close finish between the leading five in the final furlong.

Finishing order

Non-finishers

Media coverage

A special Grand National Grandstand was presented by David Coleman on the BBC for the twelfth year. Three commentators were used this year, Peter O'Sullevan, Raleigh Gilbert and Julian Wilson. Peter Bromley was the lead commentator on BBC radio.

Aftermath
John Cook retired from racing the following year on medical advice and emigrated to Australia where he died after a long illness in 1999

References

 1971
Grand National
Grand National
20th century in Lancashire
April 1971 sports events in the United Kingdom